Radalj is a village in Serbia. It is situated in the Mali Zvornik municipality, in the Mačva District of Central Serbia. The population of the village is 2,497 (2002 census) and it has an overall Serb ethnic majority.

Historical population

1948: 1,901
1953: 2,189
1961: 2,590
1971: 2,502
1981: 2,342
1991: 2,497
2002: 1,731

References

See also
List of places in Serbia

Populated places in Mačva District